Green Grove is a small village in the  community of Llanfihangel Ystrad, Ceredigion, Wales, which is 64.9 miles (104.4 km) from Cardiff and 179.1 miles (288.2 km) from London. Green Grove is represented in the Senedd by Elin Jones (Plaid Cymru) and is part of the Ceredigion constituency in the House of Commons.

References

See also
List of Scheduled prehistoric Monuments in Ceredigion
List of localities in Wales by population

Villages in Ceredigion